Ian Alexander Wishart (born 25 December 1948) is a former English cricketer. Wishart was a right-handed batsman who bowled right-arm medium-fast. He was born at Greenside, County Durham.

Wishart made his debut for Durham against Cumberland in the 1971 Minor Counties Championship. He played minor counties cricket for Durham from 1971 to 1980, making a total of nineteen appearances for the county, the last of which came against Shropshire. In 1979, he made a single List A appearance for Minor Counties North against Kent at Lindum Sports Club Ground, Lincoln, in the 1979 Benson & Hedges Cup, He was dismissed for a duck in the match by Derek Underwood, while with the ball he bowled seven wicketless overs, with Kent winning by 9 wickets.

References

External links
Ian Wishart at ESPNcricinfo
Ian Wishart at CricketArchive

1948 births
Living people
People from County Durham (before 1974)
English cricketers
Durham cricketers
Minor Counties cricketers
Cricketers from Tyne and Wear